Hubert Menten (12 September 1873 – 8 May 1964) was a Dutch bobsledder. He competed in the four-man event at the 1928 Winter Olympics.

Biography
Menten was a brakeman. Ahead of the 1928 Summer Olympics he won 51 prizes; of which 22 first prizes, 13 second prizes and 16 third prizes. At the 1928 Winter Olympics in Saint Moritz he was part of the first Dutch bobsleigh team in the four-man event (the Dutch didn't participate in 1924) together with Curt van de Sandt (captain), Henri Louis Dekking, Edwin Louis Teixeira de Mattos and Jacques Delprat. The Dutch team finished 8th in the first run and finished 12th overall after the second run.

References

1873 births
1964 deaths
Dutch male bobsledders
Olympic bobsledders of the Netherlands
Bobsledders at the 1928 Winter Olympics
Dutch people of the Dutch East Indies